|}

The Noel Murless Stakes is a Listed flat horse race in Great Britain open to three year old horses. It is run at Ascot over a distance of 1 mile 6 furlongs and 34 yards (2,847 metres), and it is scheduled to take place each year in late September or early October.

The race was first run in 2002 and is named after Noel Murless (1910-1987), a racehorse trainer who was British flat racing Champion Trainer on nine occasions. Prior to 2011 it was run at Newmarket Racecourse.

Winners since 2002

See also 
 Horse racing in Great Britain
 List of British flat horse races

References 

Racing Post: 

Flat races in Great Britain
Ascot Racecourse
Flat horse races for three-year-olds
Recurring sporting events established in 2002
2002 establishments in England